Calvin Theological Seminary is a private Christian Reformed Church seminary in Grand Rapids, Michigan. It is closely tied to Calvin University, though each institution has its own board.

History
The seminary was founded in 1876 with the purpose of preparing ministers for the Christian Reformed Church. Originally it met on Spring Street in Grand Rapids, but in 1892 it was moved to Madison Avenue and Franklin Street. In 1917 it made the move to the Franklin Street location. It began holding classes on the Knollcrest Campus, its current location, in 1960.

In 1894, the seminary began to offer eight literary courses for the preparation for seminary studies. In 1900 these courses were expanded and made open to non-seminary students.  The school enrolled its first four female students in 1901. In 1908 the school expanded to include a full four years of high school education and two years of college, and in 1914 this was expanded to three years. In 1919 and 1920 respectively, a college president and a fourth year of college education were added, which led to the formation of Calvin College.

Presidents
 Geert Egberts Boer
 Louis Berkhof
 Samuel Volbeda
 Rienk B. Kuiper
 John H. Kromminga
 James A. De Jong
 Cornelius Plantinga
Jul Medenblik

Academics
The seminary primarily prepares students for ordained ministry within the denomination through the Master of Divinity degree, but also grants master's degrees (MA, MTS) in other subjects including worship, education, missions, and theological studies.

The seminary also offers a Th.M. with concentrations in Old Ancient Near Eastern Languages and Literature, New
Historical Theology, Systematic Theology, Philosophical and Moral Theology, Pastoral Care, Church Polity and Administration, Preaching, Worship, Educational Ministry, and Missions, as well as the PhD degree in historical, systematic, and philosophical theology, and in ethics.

In addition to formal degrees, the seminary offers continuing education, including courses that are open to visitors, lectures, book discussion groups, and conferences for clergy and those in the community.

Notable alumni and faculty
 Louis Berkhof
 Clarence Bouma
 Gary M. Burge
 Anthony Hoekema
 Herman Hoeksema
 James Kennedy, professor of the history of the Netherlands at the University of Amsterdam
 Barend Klaas Kuiper, professor of history, who was dismissed after watching a movie.
 Rienk Kuiper
 Richard Muller
 James Olthuis
 Cornelius Plantinga
 Lewis Smedes
 John Stek
 Cornelius Van Til
 Geerhardus Vos
 Jeffrey A. D. Weima

References

External links
Calvin Theological Seminary website
Kerux, the online student publication of Calvin Theological Seminary

 
Seminaries and theological colleges in Michigan
Education in Grand Rapids, Michigan
Reformed church seminaries and theological colleges in the United States
Educational institutions established in 1876
Universities and colleges in Kent County, Michigan
1876 establishments in Michigan
Christian Reformed Church in North America